Žáček (feminine Žáčková) is a Czech surname derived from a diminutive of Žák ("student"). Notable people include:

 Dušan Žáček, Czech basketball player
 Jakub Žáček, Czech film, television and stage actor
 Jiří Žáček, Czech poet
 Josef Žáček, Czech painter
 Lucie Žáčková, Czech actress
 Pavel Žáček, Czech doctor of philosophy

See also
Žák, Czech surname
Zak (surname), Russian surname
Żak, Polish surname

Czech-language surnames